A still is an apparatus used to distill liquid mixtures.

Still may also refer to:

Film, television, and theater
 Film still, a photograph taken on the set of a film or television show and used for promotional purposes
 Still frame, one single image chosen from a film or video for preview or similar purposes
 Still (film), a 2014 British drama directed by Simon Blake
 Still Mine (working title Still), a 2012 Canadian film
 "Still" (Adventure Time), a 2011 TV episode
 "Still" (The Walking Dead), a 2014 TV episode
 Still (play), a 2013 play by Jen Silverman

Music

Albums
 Still (BeBe & CeCe Winans album) or the title song, 2009
 Still (Bill Anderson album) or the title song (see below), 1963
 Still (BoDeans album), 2008
 Still (Joy Division album), 1981
 Still (Michael Learns to Rock album), 2018
 Still (Nine Inch Nails album), included with some versions of And All That Could Have Been, 2002
 Still (Pete Sinfield album) or the title song, 1973
 Still (Richard Thompson album), 2015
 Still (SWV album) or the title song, 2016
 Still (Tony Banks album), 1991
 Still (Mazzy Star EP) or the title song, 2018
 Still (Vision of Disorder EP), 1995
 Still, by Wolverine, 2006
 Still, by Young Chop, 2014

Songs
 "Still" (Bill Anderson song), 1963
 "Still" (Commodores song), 1979
 "Still" (Katy B song), 2014
 "Still" (Lead song), 2012
 "Still" (Macy Gray song), 1999
 "Still" (Tamia song), 2004
 "Still" (Tim McGraw song), 2010
 "Still" (TVXQ song), 2012
 "Still..., by Ai, 2010
 "Still", by Alanis Morissette from Dogma: Music from the Motion Picture, 1999
 "Still", by Axium from Blindsided, 2003
 "Still", by Ben Folds from the Over the Hedge film soundtrack, 2006
 "Still", by Black Midi from Hellfire, 2022
 "Still", by Bombay Bicycle Club from A Different Kind of Fix, 2011
 "Still", by Brian McKnight from Superhero, 2001
 "Still", by Cher from Not Commercial, 2000
 "Still", by Daughter from If You Leave, 2013
 "Still", by Elvis Costello from North, 2003
 "Still", by Foo Fighters from In Your Honor, 2005
 "Still", by G-Eazy, 2016
 "Still", by the Geto Boys from The Resurrection, 1996
 "Still", by Hillsong Church from Hope, 2003
 "Still", by Karl Denver, 1963
 "Still", by Lasgo from Far Away, 2010
 "Still", by LaVern Baker, 1956
 "Still", by Niall Horan from Heartbreak Weather, 2020
 "Still", by Teyana Taylor from The Album, 2020

People
 Still (surname), a list of people with the name
 Benjamin Stillingfleet (1702–1771), English botanist; taxonomic author abbreviation Still.

Places
 Still, Bas-Rhin, Alsace, France
 Still, El Oued, Algeria

Other uses
 Aeros Still, an ultralight trike wing design
 STILL Gmbh, a German subsidiary of the KION Group that manufactures forklift trucks

See also
 
 
 Stihl, a German power-tool manufacturer
 Stil (disambiguation)
 Still's disease (disambiguation)
 Stille (disambiguation)
 Stiller (disambiguation)
 Stills (disambiguation)